This was a new event to the 2011 ITF Women's Circuit. 
Alexandra Panova won the title by defeating Marina Melnikova in the final 6–0, 6–2.

Seeds

Main draw

Finals

Top half

Bottom half

References
 Main Draw
 Qualifying Draw

Saransk Cup - Singles
Saransk Cup
2011 in Russian tennis